Rudolf Ferdinand Spitaler (7 January 1849 – 16 October 1946) was an Austrian astronomer, geophysicist, meteorologist and climatologist.

He discovered 64 IC objects whilst working at Vienna Observatory and Comet 113P/Spitaler.

He was one of the first to speculate the existence of a 13th zodiacal constellation, which later became known as Ophiuchus.

Selected works
Zeichnungen und Photographien am Grubb’schen Refractor von 68cm (27 engl. Zoll) Öffnung in den Jahren 1885 bis 1890 (1891)
Bahnbestimmung des Kometen 1851 III (Brorsen) (1894)
Periodische Verschiebungen des Schwerpunktes der Erde (1905)
Die Achsenschwankungen der Erde als Ursache der Auslösung von Erdbeben (1913)  
Das Klima des Eiszeitalters (1921)

References

External links
 
 publications by R. Spitaler in Astrophysics Data System

1849 births
1946 deaths
19th-century Austrian astronomers
Austrian meteorologists
Austrian climatologists
20th-century Austrian astronomers